Alfredo Fernández Martínez (17 May 1911 in Barcelona – 19 May 1985 in Palma de Mallorca) better known as Alfredo Mayo was a Spanish actor.

Biography 
After studying medicine, in 1929 Mayo made his debut in the theatre with the company of Ernesto Vilches. He fought for Francisco Franco in the Spanish Civil War in aviation. 
He starred in propaganda films such as  Escuadrilla (1941), Harka (1941), A mí la legión (1942) but is perhaps best known for Raza,  written by Francisco Franco under the name of Jaime de Andrade.

He became a major star in comedies, dramas and historical films such as  Malvaloca (1942), by Luis Marquina; Deliciosamente tontos (1943), by Juan de Orduña, or La leona de Castilla (1951).

In the 1950s he acted in supporting roles in such films as El último cuplé (1957),  Una muchachita de Valladolid (1958) and 55 Days at Peking (1963), directed in Spain by Nicholas Ray.

His career had a second golden age during his collaborations with Carlos Saura in La Caza (1966) and Peppermint Frappé (1967).

He appeared in more than 175 other films until his death. He acted in El bosque del lobo (1970), by Pedro Olea, Patrimonio Nacional (1980), by Luis García Berlanga. In Paul Naschy's Los cántabros (1980), he played a druid. He was also in Bearn o la sala de las muñecas (1982), by Jaime Chávarri and starred in the TV series Cañas y barro for Televisión Española.

Selected filmography
{{Div col|content=
 El ciento trece (1935) - Marcelo
 Las tres gracias (1936)
 The Queen's Flower Girl (1940)
 ¡Harka! (1941) - Capitán Santiago Balcázar
 Escuadrilla (1941) - Teniente Miguel
 Sarasate (1941) - Pablo Sarasate
 Raza (1942) - José Churruca
 Follow the Legion (1942) - El Grajo
 Malvaloca (1942) - Leonardo
 El frente de los suspiros (1942) - Pablo Cañaveral
 A Famous Gentleman (1943) - Rafael
 Deliciosamente tontos (1943) - Ernesto Acevedo
 El abanderado (1943) - Javier Torrealta
 Arribada forzosa (1944) - Esteban Montaño
 The Road to Babel (1945) - César Jiménez
 Afan Evu (1945)
 Su última noche (1945) - Fernando
 Audiencia pública (1946) - Raúl Pituá
 Chantaje (1946)
 Héroes del 95 (1947) - Teniente Padilla
 El huésped del cuarto número 13 (1947) - Duke of Gomara
 Obsesión (1947) - Víctor Sánchez del Campo
 Luis Candelas, el ladrón de Madrid (1947) - Luís Candelas
 Amanhã Como Hoje (1948) - Miguel
 El marqués de Salamanca (1948) - José de Salamanca
 El santuario no se rinde (1949) - Luis de Aracil
 Paz (1949) - Federico
 Séptima página (1950) - Paco
 La Virgen gitana (1951) - Eduardo Miranda
 María Antonia 'La Caramba''' (1951)
 The Lioness of Castille (1951) - Manrique
 Hombre acosado (1952) - Fussot
 The Mayor of Zalamea (1954) - Don Álvaro
 High Fashion (1954) - Ramón
 It Happened in Seville (1955) - Alberto Campos
 Suspenso en comunismo (1956) - Demetrio
 Playa prohibida (1956)
 La espera (1956)
 Piedras vivas (1956)
 The Last Torch Song (1957) - Gran Duque Vladimir de Rusia
 Il maestro... (1957) - Principal
 Heroes del Aire (1958) - Coronel Gonzalo Rivas
 Una muchachita de Valladolid (1958) - Raimundo Aymat - el Canciller
 15 bajo la lona (1959) - Capitán
 Canto para ti (1959) - Pedro
 Pasos de angustia (1959)
 Legions of the Nile (1959) - Ottaviano Augusto
 Mission in Morocco (1959) - Major Selim Naruf
 Monsieur Robinson Crusoe (1960)
 Juanito (1960) - Colonel Cuesta
 Un ángel tuvo la culpa (1960) - Comisario
 Fountain of Trevi (1960) - Sor Giovanni
 Don Lucio y el hermano pío (1960) - Casinos
 One Step Forward (1960)
 Queen of the Tabarin Club (1960) - Charles
 Alerta en el cielo (1961) - Coronel Gadea
 Revolt of the Mercenaries (1961) - Marco
 Darling (1961) - Minister
 Armas contra la ley (1961)
 Fray Escoba (1961) - Don Juan de Porres
 Teresa de Jesús (1962) - Padre Francisco de Borja
 Historia de una noche (1962) - Del Río
 The Legion's Last Patrol (1962) - Mayor
 Siempre en mi recuerdo (1962)
 Los guerrilleros (1963) - Padre Antonio
 El turista (1963) - Don Luis
 55 Days at Peking (1963) - Spanish Minister
 Tomy's Secret (1963)
 Cerrado por asesinato (1964) - Luis de la Hoz, novelista
 Cyrano et d'Artagnan (1964) - (uncredited)
 Alféreces provisionales (1964) - Baquero
 Casi un caballero (1964) - Eduardo Montalbán - inspector de policía
 Bullets and the Flesh (1964) - Mortimer Lasky
 Badmen of the West (1964) - Philipp
 El señor de La Salle (1964) - Lanceroy
 Faites vos jeux, mesdames (1965)
 Agent 077: Mission Bloody Mary (1965)
 Two Mafiosi Against Goldginger (1965) - Automobilista Affeminato
 Misión Lisboa (1965) - Losky
 Cartes sur table (1966) - Baxter
 Las últimas horas... (1966) - Juan de la Cierva
 The Hunt (1966) - Paco
 Special Mission Lady Chaplin (1966) - Sir Hillary
 Ypotron - Final Countdown (1966) - Morrow / Leikman
 Dos alas (1967)
 Peppermint Frappé (1967) - Pablo
 Si volvemos a vernos (1968) - Luis
 Madigan's Millions (1968)
 Este cura (1968)
 No le busques tres pies... (1968) - Mota
 El paseíllo (1968)
 El taxi de los conflictos (1969) - Alfredo, el amante
 Hell Commandos (1969) - Prof. van Kolstrom
 Los desafíos (1969) - Germán (segment 2)
 Eagles Over London (1969) - English officer (uncredited)
 ¿Quién soy yo? (1970) - Pedro Astófano
 In the Folds of the Flesh (1970) - André
 El mejor del mundo (1970) - Doctor Márquez
 Sabata the Killer (1970) - Garfield
 El bosque del lobo (1970) - Don Nicolás de Valcárcel
 Los gallos de la madrugada (1971) - Padre de Paco
 La red de mi canción (1971) - Don Manuel Duval
 My Dear Killer (1972) - Beniamino
 Monta in sella, figlio di… (1972) - André, Agnes' Uncle
 Un dólar de recompensa (1972) - John Wolley
 Marianela (1972) - D. Francisco
 Entre dos amores (1972) - Duque de Agramonte
 Trop jolies pour être honnêtes (1972)
 The Call of the Wild (1972) - Judge Miller
 Those Dirty Dogs (1973) - General Müller, El Supremo
 The Scarlet Letter (1973) - Gov. Fuller
 La llamaban La Madrina (1973) - Don Ramón
 The Bell from Hell (1973) - Don Pedro
 Volveré a nacer (1973) - Oscar
 Storia di karatè, pugni e fagioli (1973) - Colonel Randolf Quint
 Vida conyugal sana (1974) - Don Alfonso
 Proceso a Jesús (1974) - Profesor Bellido
 Vera, un cuento cruel (1974) - D. Juan Manuel
 El calzonazos (1974) - Héctor Goizueta
 Voodoo Black Exorcist (1974) - Dr. Kessling
 Los caballeros del Botón de Ancla (1974) - Morales
 Chicas de alquiler (1974) - Don Carlos
 Doctor, me gustan las mujeres, ¿es grave? (1974) - Dr. Ángel Alcántara
 Larga noche de julio (1974) - Padre de Toni
 Naked Therapy (1975) - Doctor Armayor
 Un día con Sergio (1976) - Productor
 La amante perfecta (1976)
 El límite del amor (1976) - Ricardo
 Call Girl (La vida privada de una señorita bien) (1976) - Alejandro
 La espuela (1976) - Don Pedro
 El chiste (1976) - Hombre emocionado / Emiliano / Alfredo
 Pasión (1977)
 El apolítico (1977) - Sr. Bustos
 Secretos de alcoba (1977) - Conde
 Estoy hecho un chaval (1977) - Don Amalio
 Gusanos de seda (1977) - D. Ernesto
 Delirio d'amore (1977) - Aldo
 Los restos del naufragio (1978) - Don Emilio
 Oro Rojo (1978) - Padre de Aurelia
 Avisa a Curro Jiménez (1978) - Don Fulgencio
 Cabo de vara (1978)
 Encuentro en el abismo (1979) - Pop
 Con uñas y dientes (1979) - Rodolfo Ortiz
 El tahúr (1979)
 Manaos (1979) - Sebastián
 Los cántabros (1980) - Lábaro
 Patrimonio nacional (1981) - Nacho
 Quiero soñar (1981) - Alfredo
 La leyenda del tambor (1981) - Abuelo de Clussá
 Perdóname, amor (1982)
 Cecilia (1982) - General Vives
 Cristóbal Colón, de oficio... descubridor (1982) - Fray Diego de Deza
 Hablamos esta noche (1982) - Padre
 Bearn o la sala de las muñecas (1983) - Vicario
 Mar brava (1983) - Anchoa
 El Cid cabreador (1983) - Padre de Rodrigo
 Poppers (1984) - Pablo Jordan
 Luces de bohemia (1985) - Marqués de Bradomín
 El suizo - un amour en Espagne (1985) - (final film role)
}}

 Awards 

 Círculo de escritores cinematográficos in 1966 for La caza and in 1969 for Los desafíos.
 Sindicato Nacional del Espectáculo in (1973) for La campana del infierno''.

External links
 

1911 births
1985 deaths
Male actors from Barcelona
Spanish male stage actors
Spanish male film actors
20th-century Spanish male actors